Tekki may refer to:

Naihanchi, also known as Tekki, a series of kata in Karate

Steel Battalion, also known as Tekki, a video game created by Capcom